van Albada may refer to:

Gale Bruno van Albada (1912-1972), Dutch astronomer
Van Albada (crater), a crater on the moon named after him
2019 van Albada, a meteor named after him